John Niles may refer to:

John Milton Niles (1787–1856), American lawyer and politician
John Jacob Niles (1892–1980), American composer and singer
John Niles (scholar) (born 1945), American scholar of medieval English literature
John W. Niles (1876–1961), Canadian politician in the Legislative Assembly of New Brunswick
John Wayne Niles, American Reconstruction era political organizer